14 teams took part in the 2004–05 season of the Kuwaiti Premier League with Al Qadisiya Kuwait winning the championship.

League standings

Championship playoff

Places 5-8

References
Kuwait - List of final tables (RSSSF)

Kuwait Premier League seasons
1
Kuw